The Tasmanian ruffe, Tubbia tasmanica, is a medusafish of the family Centrolophidae, found in temperate waters in the Indian and southwest Pacific Oceans, at depths of between 700 and 850 m. Its length is up to 67 cm.

References 

Centrolophidae
Fish described in 1943